Sjors Ultee (born 23 May 1987) is a Dutch football manager, who is the current manager of the Eredivisie club SC Cambuur.

Managerial career
Ultee was briefly an amateur footballer, but at a young age was planning on becoming a sports doctor or teacher. In 2006 he started working with FC Utrecht as assistant technique trainer. In 2009, he became a part-time trainer at the club, and in 2014 became an assistant manager under Rob Alflen. After stints as assistant manager with FC Twente and Helmond, Ultee was appointed the manager of Fortuna Sittard in the Eredivisie on 13 June 2019.

References

External links
 
 FDB Profile

1987 births
Living people
Footballers from Utrecht (city)
Dutch footballers
Dutch football managers
Fortuna Sittard managers
Fortuna Sittard non-playing staff
Eredivisie managers
Association footballers not categorized by position